In mathematics, equivariant K-theory refers to either
equivariant algebraic K-theory, an equivariant analog of algebraic K-theory
equivariant topological K-theory, an equivariant analog of topological K-theory